Nagasawa Dam is a dam in Kōchi Prefecture, Japan.

Dams in Kōchi Prefecture
Dams completed in 1949